Atriplex pusilla is a species of saltbush known by the common names smooth saltbush and dwarf orach. It is native to the Northwestern United States from California to Idaho, where it grows in saline and alkaline soils, such as those near hot springs and ephemeral ponds.

Description
This is a small annual herb producing a stiff, branching, reddish-green stem which approaches 30 centimeters in maximum height. The thick, fleshy leaves are rounded in shape and less than 2 centimeters long. The tiny flowers are borne in pairs or singly.

References

External links
Jepson Manual Treatment
USDA Plants Profile
Flora of North America

pusilla
Flora of the Great Basin
Halophytes
Flora of California
Flora of Idaho
Flora of Nevada
Flora of Oregon
Plants described in 1871
Flora without expected TNC conservation status